Qiu Zhuoyang (born 23 June 1996) is a Chinese tennis player.

Qiu has a career high ATP singles ranking of 1404 achieved on 24 October 2016. He also has a career high ATP doubles ranking of 767 achieved on 29 August 2016.

Qiu made his ATP main draw debut at the 2014 ATP Shenzhen Open, in the doubles draw partnering Te Rigele.

External links

1996 births
Living people
Chinese male tennis players
Sportspeople from Nantong
Tennis players from Jiangsu
21st-century Chinese people